Doug Ford (born 1964) is a Canadian politician and businessman and the current Premier of Ontario.

Douglas or Doug Ford may also refer to:
Douglas Ford (bishop) (1917–2007), Anglican bishop in Canada
Douglas Ford (British Army officer) (1918–1943), British Army officer awarded the George Cross
Douglas Morey Ford (1851–1916), English lawyer and novelist
Doug Ford (golfer) (1922–2018), American golfer
Doug Ford (cricketer) (1928−2019, Australian cricketer
Doug Ford Sr. (1933–2006), Canadian businessman, Member of Provincial Parliament (Ontario), father of the premier
Doug Ford (musician) (born 1945), Australian rock musician